Skallen Glacier is a glacier flowing to Lutzow-Holm Bay to the east of Skallen Hills. Mapped from surveys and air photos by Japanese Antarctic Research Expedition (JARE), 1957–62, and named for its proximity to Skallen Hills.

See also
 List of glaciers in the Antarctic
 Glaciology

References
 

Glaciers of Queen Maud Land
Prince Harald Coast